The Malviya or Malaviya are a Brahmin sub-caste found in the states of Uttar Pradesh, Assam and Madhya Pradesh in India.

The word Malviya literally means those from Malwa in Central India. They are a branch of the Panch Gauda Brahmins.

Notable People
Amit Malviya
Bapulal Malviya
Chintamani Malviya
Govind Malaviya
Kartikey Malviya
Keshav Dev Malviya
Laljiram Malviya
Madan Mohan Malaviya
Neeraj Malviya
Radhakishan Malviya
Ramlal Malviya
Ratanlal Kishorilal Malviya
Satya Prakash Malaviya
Shakti Malviya
Surendra Malviya

References

Surnames
Indian surnames
Hindu surnames
Surnames of Indian origin
Brahmin communities
Brahmin communities of Uttar Pradesh
Brahmin communities of Madhya Pradesh
Surnames of Hindustani origin